Aclytia ventralis is a moth of the family Erebidae. It was described by Félix Édouard Guérin-Méneville in 1843. It is found in Mexico, Guatemala, Costa Rica and Panama.

References

Moths described in 1843
Aclytia
Moths of North America